Vanessa Northington Gamble (born 1953) is a physician who chaired the Tuskegee Syphilis Study Legacy Committee in 1996.

Early life and education 
Born in West Philadelphia, Gamble was primarily raised by her maternal grandmother. She attended Philadelphia High School for Girls and graduated in 1970, then studied medical sociology and biology at Hampshire College, graduating with her bachelor's degree in 1974. Gamble then attended medical school and graduate school at the University of Pennsylvania, earning her M.D. in 1983 and her Ph.D. in the history and sociology of science in 1987. She completed her graduate medical education (residency) at the University of Massachusetts.

Career 
Gamble began her career with appointments at the Harvard School of Public Health, Hampshire College, and the University of Massachusetts. In 1989, she was appointed an associate professor at the University of Wisconsin, where she taught courses on the intersection of race and public health in the United States. At the University of Wisconsin Medical School, she founded and was director of its Center for the Study of Race and Ethnicity.

In 1996, Gamble chaired a committee to investigate the Tuskegee Syphilis Study, an unethical, racist study of long-term syphilis infection in black men. The committee's final report, published on May 20, called for then-President Bill Clinton to issue an apology in response to the harm done to the Macon County community and Tuskegee University, and the fears of government and medical abuse it created among African Americans. The report also called for the creation of programs to educate the public regarding the study, to train health care providers, and for ethics in scientific research. President Clinton issued a formal apology on behalf of the government on May 16, 1997. In her seminal article written later in 1997, she explained however that while the Tuskegee Syphilis Study contributed to African Americans' continuing mistrust of the biomedical community, the study was not the most important reason. She called attention to a broader historical and social context that had already negatively influenced community attitudes, including countless prior medical injustices before the study's start in 1932.

She left the University of Wisconsin in 2000, and moved to Tuskegee University, where she led the first National Bioethics Center to be established at a historically black university. Beginning in 2003, Gamble was a professor at Johns Hopkins University in the school of public health. As of 2016, she is a professor of medical humanities at George Washington University, where she began teaching in 2007.

Gamble has also worked with research organizations, including the Centers for Disease Control and Prevention, National Institute of Medicine, National Institutes of Health, and the American Foundation for AIDS Research.

Publications 

 "Standardizing return of participant results"
 "Outstanding Services to Negro Health": Dr. Dorothy Boulding Ferebee, Dr. Virginia M. Alexander, and Black Women Physicians' Public Health Activism.
 "The Immortal Life of Henrietta Lacks reconsidered."
 "No struggle, no fight, no court battle": the 1948 desegregation of the University of Arkansas School of Medicine.
 "There wasn't a lot of comforts in those days:" African Americans, public health, and the 1918 influenza epidemic.
 "Midian Othello Bousfield: advocate for the medical and public health concerns of Black Americans."
 "Standing on shoulders."
 "NIH consensus development statement on hydroxyurea treatment for sickle cell disease."
 "National Institutes of Health Consensus Development Conference statement: hydroxyurea treatment for sickle cell disease."
 "Introduction to special issue: advancing the ethics of community-based participatory research."
 "Mistrust among minorities and the trustworthiness of medicine."
 "U.S. policy on health inequities: the interplay of politics and research."
 "Subcutaneous scars." Health Affairs 19, no. 1 (January/February 2000): 164-169.
 "Under the shadow of Tuskegee: African Americans and health care." American Journal of Public Health 87, no. 11 (1997): 1773-1778.
 "Making a Place for Ourselves: The Black Hospital Movement, 1920-1945". New York: Oxford University Press, 1993.
 The “boom and bust phenomenon”: the hopes, dreams, and broken promises of the contraceptive revolution

Honors and awards 
 Head, Association of American Medical Colleges Division of Community and Minority Programs (1999)
 Member, National Academy of Medicine (2005)
 University Professor, George Washington University (2007)

References 

African-American physicians
American public health doctors
African-American women physicians
1953 births
Living people
Hampshire College alumni
University of Pennsylvania alumni
George Washington University faculty
Perelman School of Medicine at the University of Pennsylvania alumni
Philadelphia High School for Girls alumni
Medical sociologists
20th-century American women physicians
20th-century American physicians
21st-century American women physicians
21st-century American physicians
Members of the National Academy of Medicine
Women public health doctors